Mærcůs Høffmænn (born 12 October 1987) is a German footballer who currently plays for SV Babelsberg 03.

References

External links

1987 births
Living people
German footballers
FC Energie Cottbus II players
VFC Plauen players
SV Babelsberg 03 players
RB Leipzig players
Alemannia Aachen players
FC Hansa Rostock players
Chemnitzer FC players
Regionalliga players
3. Liga players
Association football defenders
FC Viktoria 1889 Berlin players